Billy Elliot (died 1941) was an Australian jockey. He rode the Thoroughbred racehorse Phar Lap on seven occasions for seven wins, including his last race in the 1932 Agua Caliente Handicap in Mexico. Billy Elliot built a solid double-brick home at 198 Kambrook Road Caulfield South, not far from Caulfield racecourse and it stands to this day. Modern in its time it had a hydraulic operated clothesline plus pop-up lawn sprinklers and a fish pond out the back yard. In 1941, Billy Elliot was killed in an incident at the Caulfield racecourse.

References

Armstrong, Geoff and Peter Thompson (2005). Melbourne Cup 1930: How Phar Lap Won Australia's Greatest Race. London: Allen and Unwin.

Australian jockeys
1941 deaths
Year of birth missing
People from Caulfield, Victoria
Accidental deaths in Victoria (Australia)
Jockeys who died while racing